Krešimir Prgomet (born June 11, 1986) is a Croatian retired footballer, who most notably played for Croatian top tier-outfit Cibalia.

Career 
Prgomet began his career in 2008 with NK Marsonia in the Croatian Third Football League (3. HNL) and later with NK Oriolik. In 2008, he signed with NK Graničar Županja and finished as the top goalscorer in the Western division of the 3. HNL. In 2009, he signed with HNK Cibalia in the Croatian First Football League. During his time with Cibalia he appeared in the 2010–11 UEFA Europa League against Cliftonville F.C. In 2012, he signed with NK Istra 1961 where he appeared in 17 matches and recorded 1 goal.

In 2013, he played with HNK Primorac Biograd na Moru. Shortly after he played abroad with Toronto Croatia in the Canadian Soccer League. He made his debut on May 25, 2013 against London City, where he scored a goal in a 4-1 victory. In his debut season he finished as the club's top goalscorer with 10 goals. He also featured in the postseason against SC Waterloo, where Toronto was eliminated from the competition after losing 5-4 in a penalty shootout. In 2014, he played in Switzerland with NK Pajde Möhlin, where he participated in the Croatian World Club Championship.

References

External links
 

1986 births
Living people
Sportspeople from Slavonski Brod
Association football forwards
Croatian footballers
NK Marsonia players
HNK Cibalia players
NK Istra 1961 players
HNK Primorac Biograd na Moru players
Toronto Croatia players
Second Football League (Croatia) players
First Football League (Croatia) players
Croatian Football League players
Canadian Soccer League (1998–present) players
Croatian expatriate footballers
Expatriate soccer players in Canada
Croatian expatriate sportspeople in Canada
Expatriate footballers in Switzerland
Croatian expatriate sportspeople in Switzerland